Jonas in the Jungle is a 2013 documentary film by Peter Sempel about the filmmaker Jonas Mekas. It is part of a long term series of films about Mekas (Jonas in the Desert (1991), Jonas at the Ocean (2004)). The earlier films were focused more on Mekas' work, while this film is more about the life of the 'legend of film avant-garde' as he enters his 90s, still working, and still maintaining relevance in the modern world.

The film also explores the Anthology Film Archives, of which Mekas' was one of the cofounders.

The film premiered Oct 3, 2013, in Hamburg, Germany.

References

External links
 Official Site
 

2013 documentary films
2013 films
Documentary films about film directors and producers
German documentary films
Films set in New York City
Films shot in New York City
Jonas Mekas
2010s German films